The Fourth North Carolina Provincial Congress was one of five extra-legal unicameral bodies that met beginning in the summer of 1774 through 1776.  They were modeled after the colonial lower house (House of Commons).  These congresses created a government structure, issued bills of credit to pay for the movement, organized an army for defense, wrote a constitution and bill of rights that established the state of North Carolina, and elected their first acting governor in the fifth congress that met in 1776.   These congresses paved the way for the first meeting of the North Carolina General Assembly on April 7, 1777 in New Bern, North Carolina.  The Fourth Congress met in Halifax from April 4 to May 14, 1776. Samuel Johnston served as president, with Allen Jones as vice-president.

Legislation

The delegates authorized their representatives to the Second Continental Congress to vote for the Declaration of Independence, including Joseph Hewes, William Hooper, and John Penn.  The 83 delegates present on April 12, 1776 adopted the Halifax Resolves.  On April 13, 1776, the delegates formed a committee to start working on a North Carolina Constitution, which was ratified in December 1776 by the Fifth North Carolina Provincial Congress.  In April, 1776, the congress passed a resolve to move loyalists while allowing them to dispose of their property.  Later in May 1776, the congress passed a resolve to confiscate the property of those taking up arms against the United States.

Members

The following list shows the names of the delegates and the counties or districts that they represented:

Notes:

See also
 Provincial Congress
 North Carolina General Assembly

References

Further reading
 
 
 
 , North Carolina State Normal & Industrial, College Historical Publications, Number 2

Provincial Fourth
1776 establishments in North Carolina
1776 disestablishments in North Carolina
Provincial Fourth
North Carolina
 Provincial Fourth